The Men's 4 × 100 metre medley relay competition of the 2016 FINA World Swimming Championships (25 m) was held on 11 December 2016.

Records
Prior to the competition, the existing world and championship records were as follows.

Results

Heats
The heats were held at 10:19.

Final
The final was held at 20:14.

References

Men's 4 x 100 metre medley relay